Bosnia and Herzegovina vehicle registration plates have held their current form since 2 February 1998. Currently the Bosnia and Herzegovina (BiH) vehicle registration plate format consists of seven characters: five numbers and two letters arranged in the following order: X00-X-000 (taxis: TA-000000). The plates are uniform across the country and do not denote the place (town, municipality, canton, or entity) where the vehicle is registered, as was the case prior to 1998. Likewise the plates do not contain any heraldic symbols. The plates use only letters which are represented equally in Latin and Cyrillic script (A, E, O, J, K, M, T).

Special plates

Working road machine plates had the regional letters at the top, and then numbers. These plates are white in blue plates.
Temporary plates had letters "TT" followed by 6 numbers (TT - Testne Tablice). The letters are colored red. (e.g. TT-000000)
Military plates had Eurostrip-like from previous series (XX-nnnnLL) but without the blue background. This plate consists of 5 numbers then one letter (e.g. 00000-X)
Diplomatic plates had blue background and yellow font. Unlike previous series, the first group of numbers is two and the letter it can be used is A, C, M and E. (e.g. 00-A-000)
EUPM plates used yellow background and the prefix "EUPM" followed by a numbers.
Export plates had blue in white background plates with civilian format.
Foreign owned plates had white in blue plates. Numbers and letters are with blue color.
UNHCR plates had the prefix "UNHCR" (and numbers) in blue color.
Agricultural vehicles had regional letters at the top, then numbers. Had a white in green plates.
UNSF plates had the prefix "SFOR" and the color of the plate black in blue.
NATO plates had the prefix "NATO" (emblem as divider) and the color of the plate is black in light green.
UN Trailers had the style of "UN 1234T"

History
The revised registration plates were introduced as an initiative of the International High Representative for Bosnia and Herzegovina, Carlos Westendorp. In a report from the Office of the High Representative for Bosnia and Herzegovina prior to the decision, it had been noted that police conduct around the Inter-Entity Boundary Line separating the two entities of Bosnia and Herzegovina, the Federation of Bosnia and Herzegovina and Republika Srpska, had been the "greatest obstacle to freedom of movement", including intimidation and arbitrary fines.

Elsewhere it has been noted that vehicles which bore licence plates from one entity would be subject to vandalism in the other entity. The development of licence plates which would not serve as proxy identifiers of driver ethnicity was a partial solution to these problems. However, Bosnian towns typically contain all three constitutional ethnicities (Bosniaks, Croats and Serbs) making ethnic identity unclear regardless of the vehicle's origin. The post-1998 system of obscuring the region is also complicated by the fact that drivers of cars, lorries and buses proud of their ethnicity will advertise this phenomenon with all the matching insignia. For example: Croats and Serbs may drive with crosses hanging from their mirrors; besides the fact that Catholic and Orthodox crosses vary in design, they may also have by the cross - or elsewhere visible - their national flags. In addition, Croats and Serbs in areas where they form a majority do not display the flag of Bosnia and Herzegovina or any national Bosnian symbols, making it clear that where Bosnian national markers are shown - whether attached to the registration plate, the back of the car or the interior - the driver/family is Bosniak.

City codes

Prior to 1992

Republic of Bosnia and Herzegovina

On the territory controlled by Army of the Republic of Bosnia and Herzegovina from 1992 were used new license plates. They wore a blue strip on the left side with the "BIH" script and the coat of arms above the script (1992 is no blue stripe). On the white background the form was XX-nnnnLL or XX-nnnnnL, where "XX" was the code of the city, "nnnn"/"nnnnn" were digits, and "LL" two letters (previously one letter), where the first letter denoted the municipality where it was issued (before this is not at all). Towns are given in following table:

Republika Srpska

On territory of the Republika Srpska entity, license plates were used similar to those before the war, with difference that instead of red star, the Serb four-S coat of arms was used. Letters on plates were usually in Cyrillic script, but the license plates with Latin versions of codes are also used.

Croatian Republic of Herzeg-Bosnia

On the territory of the Croatian Republic of Herzeg-Bosnia, license plates were used similar to those of Croatia, with difference in the shape of shield in Croat coat of arms ("checkerboard"-"šahovnica").

Diplomatic, consular and foreign mission plate prefixes

These prefixes were also valid for Croatia from 1991 to 1994.

References

External links
 First license plate in Bosnia

Bosnia-Herzegovina
Road transport in Bosnia and Herzegovina
Bosnia and Herzegovina transport-related lists
 Registration plates